Meike Weber (born 7 April 1983) is a German football midfielder who currently plays for TSG Neu-Isenburg.

She won the 2005–06 UEFA Women's Cup with 1. FFC Frankfurt, and was also a losing finalist with the same team in the 2011-12 UEFA Women's Champions League. She represented Germany on three youth international levels.

References

1987 births
Living people
German women's footballers
Germany women's youth international footballers
1. FFC Frankfurt players
TSV Schott Mainz players
Frauen-Bundesliga players
Women's association football midfielders
People from Erbach im Odenwald
Sportspeople from Darmstadt (region)
Footballers from Hesse